The 2005 Nordea Nordic Light Open was a women's tennis tournament played on outdoor hard courts. It was the 4th edition of the Nordic Light Open, and was part of the Tier IV Series of the 2005 WTA Tour. It took place in Stockholm, Sweden, from 8 through 14 August 2005. Fifth-seeded Katarina Srebotnik won the singles title and earned $22,000 first-prize money.

Finals

Singles

  Katarina Srebotnik defeated  Anastasia Myskina, 7–5, 6–2
It was the 2nd title for Srebotnik in the season and the 4th title of her singles career.

Doubles

  Émilie Loit /  Katarina Srebotnik defeated  Eva Birnerová /  Mara Santangelo, 6–4, 6–3
It was the 11th title for Loit and the 10th title for Srebotnik in their respective doubles careers.

References

External links
 ITF tournament edition details
 Tournament draws

Nordea Nordic Light Open
2005
2005 in Swedish women's sport
2000s in Stockholm
August 2005 sports events in Europe
Nordic